The marbled wren-babbler (Turdinus marmoratus) is a species of bird in the family Pellorneidae.  It is found in the Malay Peninsula and the Barisan Mountains of Sumatra.  Its natural habitats are subtropical or tropical moist lowland forest and subtropical or tropical moist montane forest.

References

Collar, N. J. & Robson, C. 2007. Family Timaliidae (Babblers)  pp. 70 – 291 in; del Hoyo, J., Elliott, A. & Christie, D.A. eds. Handbook of the Birds of the World, Vol. 12. Picathartes to Tits and Chickadees. Lynx Edicions, Barcelona.

marbled wren-babbler
Birds of the Malay Peninsula
Birds of Sumatra
marbled wren-babbler
marbled wren-babbler
Taxonomy articles created by Polbot